The Denver and Rio Grande Western K-28 is a class of ten  gauge narrow gauge  "Mikado" type steam locomotives built in 1923 by the Schenectady Locomotive Works of the American Locomotive Company (ALCO) for the Denver & Rio Grande Railroad. They were the first new narrow gauge locomotives ordered by the railroad since 1903.  They initially comprised class E-4-148-S, but were reclassified K-28 in 1924 when the railroad reorganized into the Denver & Rio Grande Western Railroad.

Design 

The chassis is of outside-frame design with the drive wheels placed between the two main frames and the steam cylinders and running gear (cranks, counterweights, rods and valve gear) to the outside.  This general arrangement was also used on the earlier class K-27 and later class K-36 and K-37 engines.

Operations 
Among other duties, they were tasked with hauling the express passenger trains over the D&RGW's narrow gauge lines, such as the San Juan from Alamosa to Durango, the Shavano from Salida to Gunnison and The Silverton from Durango to Silverton. The K-28s also operated on the Chili Line from Antonito to Santa Fe until that route was closed in 1941.

White Pass & Yukon
During World War II, seven members of the class were purchased by the US Army for use on the White Pass and Yukon Route in Alaska and the Yukon where they were renumbered USA 250 to USA 256. But they did not fare well in the bitter Yukon winters.  In particular, the unusual, extended counterweights on the driving wheel axles made them liable to ride up on trackside ice, and as a result, lifting the engine off the rails. All seven were withdrawn from service in 1944 (coinciding with the winding-down of military operations, and the return of WP&Y to civilian control) and were barged to Seattle in 1946 for scrapping.

The K-28s today

The three locos which remained with the D&RGW, numbers 473, 476 and 478, were assigned to the Durango – Silverton tourist trains from the 1950s onwards. The Durango & Silverton inherited these when it took over the Silverton Branch in 1981. As of June 2022, locomotives 473 and 476 are in active service and have both been converted from coal-burning to oil-burning. Locomotive 478 is on temporary display in the D&SNG roundhouse museum where locomotive 476 was previously placed in, but will eventually undergo a complete overhaul.

Due to their smaller size, these engines are often used by the Durango & Silverton for shorter trains, usually the first or last on the schedule, and also for helper service or sectioned trains. Despite being slightly smaller, a little older and less powerful than the K-36s, the engine crews tend to favor a trip on these engines because the design ALCO used was superior in balance and servicing. Firing can be tricky when the engine is working hard, as the clamshell-style firedoors tend to pull into the backhead of the boiler due to the draft, and if any flues in the boiler are leaking, the loss of draft on the fire is much harder to work around than on the K-36 locomotives. Firing while the engine is working hard is done with a large "heel" pattern, generally with as little coal on the flue sheet as possible, and gradually sloping the fire bed towards the door sheet to the height or higher than the firedoors. This results in the draft being forced through the fire bed in the thinner areas towards the flue sheet, which usually is hindered by the lack of draft between the grates and the arch brick. New firemen sometimes have a hard time learning this because there are fewer training hours available on the K-28 class locomotives compared to the railroad's usual K-36 workhorses which have a larger firebox and are more forgiving of poor technique.

These locomotives are popular subjects for model railroaders and high quality scale models in HOn3 and On3 scales have been produced by several manufacturers since the 1950s.

Variants 
The Oahu Railway and Land Company in Hawaii was impressed with the K-28 and ordered four locomotives of the same design which were delivered in 1925 and 1926. These were identical in specification but oil-fired and with minor differences in fittings (slightly shorter tender with an oil tank in place of the coal bunker, smokebox front, air compressor location, headlamp, etc.)

Roster

References

3 ft gauge locomotives
K-28
ALCO locomotives
2-8-2 locomotives
United States Army locomotives
Railway locomotives introduced in 1923
Narrow gauge steam locomotives of the United States
Passenger locomotives
Freight locomotives